The Conway Daily Sun is a five-day (Tuesday through Saturday) free daily newspaper published in North Conway, New Hampshire, United States, covering the Mount Washington Valley. It has been published since 1989 by Country News Club, and was the forerunner of three other Daily Sun newspapers in New Hampshire and Maine.

The Conway Daily Sun was the first United States daily to publish the popular numbers puzzle Sudoku.

Today 

Mark Guerringue, one of the three founders of Country News Club, still serves as publisher of The Conway Daily Sun as of early 2012.

The Daily Sun circulates in several towns of Carroll County, New Hampshire, including Albany, Bartlett (including Glen), Conway (including Intervale and North Conway), Eaton, Freedom, Jackson, Madison (including Silver Lake), Moultonborough, Tamworth (including Chocorua), Ossipee and Wolfeboro; and two towns in Oxford County, Maine: Fryeburg and Lovell.

A complete online PDF can be purchased for a years subscription of 79.99. Making locals hesitant to by in the deal. 

Lloyd Jones, Daymond Steer, Brett Guerringue, and Tom Eastman are The Conway Daily Suns staff writers. Several stringers and part-time writers also contribute regularly. Margaret McKenzie is the managing editor, Terry Leavitt edits the health section and Berlin paper. Lloyd Jones also serves as the sports editor. Alec Kerr edits the wire pages and entertainment sections and serves as the paper's entertainment critic.

Citing advertisement revenue issues, The Conway Daily Sun printed its final Monday edition on October 26, 2009. The paper continues to be published Tuesday through Saturday.

Sisters and competitors 
Conway was the first free daily to be launched by Dave Danforth, Mark Guerringue and Adam Hirshan. It was joined a few years later by The Berlin Daily Sun. In 2000, Guerringue and Hirshan partnered with Ed Engler to launch The Laconia Daily Sun in the neighboring Lakes Region of New Hampshire. In 2009, Guerringue and Hirshan teamed with Curtis Robinson to start The Portland Daily Sun in Portland, Maine.

No other daily newspaper is based in Carroll County. Country News Club's closest competitor geographically is The Citizen of Laconia.

References

External links
The Conway Daily Sun

Newspapers published in New Hampshire
Free daily newspapers
Conway, New Hampshire
Newspapers established in 1989